The Second Ikeda Cabinet was the 59th Cabinet of Japan. It was headed by Hayato Ikeda from December 8, 1960, to December 9, 1963.

Cabinet

First Cabinet reshuffle 
The first Cabinet reshuffle took place on July 18, 1961.

Second Cabinet reshuffle 
The second Cabinet reshuffle took place on July 18, 1962.

Third Cabinet reshuffle 
The third Cabinet reshuffle took place on July 18, 1963.

References 

Cabinet of Japan
1960 establishments in Japan
Cabinets established in 1960
Cabinets disestablished in 1963
1963 disestablishments in Japan